The First Thursdays Devotion, also called the Act of Reparation to the Wounds of Jesus and to the Holy Eucharist, is a Catholic devotion to offer acts of reparation. It is based on purported apparitions of Christ at Balazar, Portugal, reported by Blessed Alexandrina Maria da Costa.

According to Alexandrina Maria da Costa, popularly known as Alexandrina of Balazar, she experienced an apparition of Jesus on 25 February 1949, during which he requested a new devotion in reparation for his Holy Wounds, to be practiced on the first Thursday of every month.

Oratio Sancti Caietani
There was already at this time a long-standing first Thursdays devotion that involved praying the Respice, Domine ("Look down, O Lord"), a prayer attributed to Saint Cajetan. The prayer was to be said while kneeling before the Blessed Sacrament. A plenary indulgence was granted for the first Thursday in each month to all who would say it after confession and communion and pray for the needs of the Church. Partial indulgences were granted for saying the prayer at other times. Cajetan's prayer echoes Psalm 120, and was popular as a plea for help and protection in times of trouble.

Blessed Alexandrina's version
This devotion is performed on the first Thursdays of six consecutive months. The number six represents Jesus' five wounds of the Crucifixion (hands, feet, and side) plus his shoulder wound from carrying the cross. On these days, a person is to attend the Mass and receive the Eucharist in a state of grace "with sincere humility, fervor and love" and spend one hour before a church tabernacle containing the Eucharist, meditating on the wounds of Jesus (particularly his shoulder wound) and the sorrows of Mary.

According to Alexandrina of Balazar, Jesus said,"My daughter, My dear spouse, tell souls that I wish to be loved and consoled, and that I desire reparation to be made to Me in the Eucharist. In My Name tell all those who receive Holy Communion with sincerity and humility, fervour and love, for six consecutive first Thursdays, and spend one hour of worship, uniting their soul with Me before the tabernacle, that I promise Heaven. This is to honour My Holy Wounds through the Eucharist, primarily that of My sacred shoulder so little remembered. Those who do this, who unite the sorrows of My Blessed Mother to the Holy Wounds, and in their name ask for graces, be they spiritual or corporal, I promise to grant all requests if they are not a danger to their souls. At the moment of the death I will come to defend them, and bring my Blessed Mother with Me."

This devotion to the Holy Wounds through Eucharistic adoration was approved by the Roman Catholic Church and several promises were made by Jesus to those who practice the First Thursdays Devotion, one of which included the salvation of the soul at the moment of death.

See also
 Shoulder wound of Jesus
 Seven Sorrows of Mary

Notes

References

Further reading
 MADIGAN, Leo; Blessed Alexandrina da Costa: The Mystical Martyr of Fatima. Fatima-Ophel Books, Fátima, Portugal (2005).
 JOHNSTON, Francis W.; Alexandrina: The Agony and the Glory. Saint Benedict Press, TAN Books (2009).
 ROWLES, Kevin. Blessed Alexandrina - Living Miracle of the Eucharist. Twickenham, United Kingdom (2006)

Catholic devotions